Mesti or Mestis may refer to:

 Imset, one of the sons of Horus, whose name is sometimes transcribed Mesti
 Mesti, Morocco a small village of the Guelmim-Oued Noun
 Mestis, a league of hockey in Finland